Lachine (formerly known as Lachine—Lakeshore) was a federal electoral district in Quebec, Canada, that was represented in the House of Commons of Canada  from 1968 to 1988.

This riding was created in 1966 from Jacques-Cartier—Lasalle riding. It initially consisted of the Cities of Dorval, Lachine and Pointe-Claire and the Town of Ile-Dorval.

The riding's name was changed to "Lachine—Lakeshore" in 1973. Lachine—Lakeshore was abolished in 1976, and a new Lachine riding was created. The new riding consisted of the Cities of Beaconsfield, Dorval, and Pointe-Claire; the Town of Ile-Dorval; and the western part of the City of Lachine.

Lachine riding was abolished in 1987 when it was merged into Lachine—Lac-Saint-Louis.

Members of Parliament

This riding elected the following Members of Parliament:

Election results

Lachine, 1968–1974

Lachine—Lakeshore, 1974–1979

Lachine, 1979–1988

See also 

 List of Canadian federal electoral districts
 Past Canadian electoral districts

External links

Riding history from the Library of Parliament:
Lachine 1966-1973
Lachine-Lakeshore 1973-1976
Lachine 1976-1987

Former federal electoral districts of Quebec